Louise-Marie (F931) is a  of the Marine Component of the Belgian Armed Forces that was commissioned in 2008. It is the second of the two frigates of this class that were purchased from the Royal Netherlands Navy on 22 December 2005. It was originally commissioned in 1991 in the Netherlands, where it served as HNLMS Willem van der Zaan (F829).

Service
HNLMS Willem van der Zaan was rechristened Louise-Marie (F931) on 8 April 2008 in Antwerp by Queen Paola of Belgium. It was named after Louise-Marie, the name of a naval vessel purchased by the Belgian navy in 1840, which in turn was named after Queen Louise-Marie of Belgium, the wife of Leopold I.

Missions
In September 2010, Louise-Marie was reported to be preparing for a second deployment to the Horn of Africa.

On 29 November 2013, the ship arrived in London, UK as part of the preparations for the centenary of the start of World War I delivering soil from 70 World War I battlefields collected by British and Belgian schoolchildren for the Flanders Fields Memorial Garden in London's Wellington Barracks.

See also
, for the other ship of this class that was sold to Belgium.

References

External links
 Homepage of HNLMS Willem van der Zaan on the website of the Royal Netherlands Navy - Only available in Dutch.

 

1989 ships
Ships built in Vlissingen
Karel Doorman-class frigates of the Belgian Navy
Karel Doorman-class frigates
Naval ships of Belgium

nl:Hr. Ms. Willem van der Zaan (1991)